Christopher Ryan Baker (born March 1, 1986) is an American professional golfer who has played on the Challenge Tour and the Nationwide Tour.

Amateur career
Baker was born in Seymour, Indiana. He won the 2003 Indiana High School State Championship and lettered in golf at Iowa State University, winning the 2007 Big Four Tournament, he graduated in 2008.

Professional career
Baker turned professional in 2008 and began playing on mini-tours. He picked up his first professional victory at the NGA Hooters Tour Classic at Quail Crossing on the NGA Hooters Tour in 2009. In 2010, he won the River Hills Classic on the eGolf Professional Tour, which helped him finish sixth on the Tour's money list, earning him an exemption into the Moroccan Golf Classic on the Challenge Tour. He went on to win the event and took up membership on the Challenge Tour.

Baker returned to the United States in 2011. He began playing on the Nationwide Tour in June, but only made 3 cuts in 13 events. Baker returned to the eGolf Professional Tour and finished 29th on the money list in 2011.

Professional wins (4)

Challenge Tour wins (1)

Other wins (3)
2009 NGA Hooters Tour Classic at Quail Crossing (NGA Hooters Tour)
2010 River Hills Classic (eGolf Professional Tour)
2021 Orange County Fall Classic

Playoff record
Web.com Tour playoff record (0–1)

Results in major championships

"T" = tied

See also
2019 Korn Ferry Tour Finals graduates

References

External links
 
 
 
 
 Profile on eGolf Professional Tour's official site
 Profile on Iowa State's official athletic site

American male golfers
Iowa State Cyclones men's golfers
PGA Tour golfers
PGA Tour Latinoamérica golfers
European Tour golfers
Korn Ferry Tour graduates
Golfers from Indiana
People from Seymour, Indiana
1986 births
Living people